Dukool is a Bengali magazine that is published in the United States for Bengalis all over the world. It specifically targets first-generation and second-generation Bengalis currently living in the United States, along with Bengalis in Bangladesh and India. Dukool provides a source for all Bengalis away from home to be able to stay up to date on what is happening in their culture. Dukool was started in the hopes that it would provide a bridge for Bengalis away from home, and to help guide first and second-generation Bengalis in America.

Dukool publishes out of Cincinnati, Ohio and circulate both nationally and internationally. The magazine writes about and investigates literature, cultural trends and topics, travel, and the arts. Dukool is continuing to add to the pool of literary talent, connecting its readers with internationally recognized authors and new ideas by up-and-coming creative minds.

References
"DuKool - A Global Journal of Literature and Entertainment in Bengali and English Published in the USA." DuKool - A Global Journal of Literature and Entertainment in Bengali and English Published in the USA. N.p., n.d. Web. 13 Apr. 2013. 
"DuKool Magazine: A Literary and Entertainment Magazine." DuKool: A Literary and Entertainment Magazine. N.p., n.d. Web. 13 Apr. 2013.
"Covers, Editorials and Index Pages." Covers, Editorials and Index Pages. N.p., n.d. Web. 13 Apr. 2013.
"DuKool Magazine." Du-Kool Magazine. N.p., n.d. Web. 13 Apr. 2013.
"Sarbari Gupta, Editor." Sarbari Gupta, Editor. N.p., n.d. Web. 13 Apr. 2013.

External links
 Official website

2012 establishments in Ohio
Literary magazines published in the United States
News magazines published in the United States
Monthly magazines published in the United States
Magazines established in 2012
Magazines published in Cincinnati
Bilingual magazines